Bruce Bradley may refer to:

 Bruce Bradley (radio personality) (1933–2013), American radio personality
 Bruce Bradley (water polo) (born 1947), American water polo player